Federated Liquor and Allied Industries Employees' Union of Australia (FLAIEU) was an Australian trade union which existed between 1910 and 1992. It represented workers employed in hospitality, catering, breweries and alcohol retailing.

Formation 

The union was formed when the Victorian Liquor Trades Union merged with other state-based unions representing brewery workers in 1910. The union grew rapidly, incorporating workers from kindred industries, and in 1968 merged with the Hotel Club Restaurant and Caterers' Employees' Union of New South Wales. The New South Wales branch was the largest state branch of the union (with 68 percent of the union's membership in 1976).

Amalgamation 

In 1992 the FLAIEU amalgamated with the Federated Miscellaneous Workers' Union, which primarily represented cleaners and security staff. The resulting body, the Liquor Hospitality and Miscellaneous Workers' Union, had approximately 200,000 members at formation. The Liquor Hospitality and Miscellaneous Workers' Union later changed its name to United Voice.

Further reading

References

External links 
 lhmu.org.au The website of United Voice, the successor to the Federated Liquor and Allied Industries Union.

Defunct trade unions of Australia
Trade unions established in 1910
Trade unions disestablished in 1992
Hospitality industry trade unions